Teddy Haselmere (born Edward Ernest Hasselmeier, 1 April 1895 – 8 October 1983) was a rugby union wing who played for Leicester Tigers, Northampton Saints and Rugby Lions.  He holds a number of records for Leicester Tigers including most appearances in a season (45 in 1922–23), most tries in a season (59 in 1919–20), most tries in a calendar year (46 in 1920) and most time scores a hat-trick or better (17).  He scored 136 tries in 180 appearances for Leicester, 6th most of all-time.

Haselmere first played for his home-town of Rugby under his birth-name of Hasselmeier in 1913 but the family changed their name due to anti-German feeling arising from the First World War.  He made his debut for Leicester on 26 December 1918 in the club's first post-war game.  The next season he set the record for tries in a single season with 59 tries in 40 appearances.  He gained an England trial in the season but was not capped.  In 1922–23 he was an ever-present for the Tigers playing all 45 matches in the season but left the club the following season.  He also played for Rugby and Northampton Saints amassing 310 tries in 448 games.

In 2008 he was nominated for a place on Leicester's Walk of Legends but was beaten by Rory Underwood.

Sources

References

1895 births
1983 deaths
English rugby union players
Leicester Tigers players
Northampton Saints players
Rugby union players from Rugby, Warwickshire
Rugby union wings